Craig Steven Wilder is a professor of American history at Massachusetts Institute of Technology.

Biography
He grew up in Bedford-Stuyvesant in Brooklyn, New York. He received his Ph.D. from Columbia University focusing on urban history, under the tutelage of Kenneth T. Jackson, as well as Barbara J. Fields and Eric Foner. His doctoral dissertation was titled Race and the History of Brooklyn, New York which followed the history of Brooklyn from the arrival of the Dutch to the present day, focusing on the experiences of African-Americans. He has appeared on the History Channel's F.D.R.: A Presidency Revealed and on Ric Burns' PBS series, New York: A Documentary Film. Wilder was an assistant professor and Chair of African-American Studies at Williams College from 1995 to 2002, when he joined the faculty at Dartmouth. He remained at Dartmouth from 2002 to 2008 when he joined the faculty at MIT.

He is the author of A Covenant with Color: Race and Social Power in Brooklyn (2000), In The Company of Black Men: The African Influence on African American Culture in New York City (2001) and Ebony & Ivy (2013). He was awarded The University Medal of Excellence by Columbia University in 2004.

External links 
 Craig Steven Wilder MIT Faculty Website
 Columbia News: Celebratory Commencement Marks University's 250th Year
 Noyes Academy: The Struggle for a Black College in New Hampshire.
 

Year of birth missing (living people)
Living people
21st-century American historians
21st-century American male writers
Columbia University alumni
MIT School of Humanities, Arts, and Social Sciences faculty
People from Bedford–Stuyvesant, Brooklyn
Williams College faculty
Dartmouth College faculty
Historians from New York (state)
American male non-fiction writers